Əliləmbəyli (also, Əlilambəyli, Alilambeyli, and Alyam-Beyly) is a village and municipality in the Sabirabad Rayon of Azerbaijan.  It has a population of 651.

References 

Populated places in Sabirabad District